A village is a type of incorporated municipality within the majority of the provinces and territories of Canada.

As of January 1, 2012, there were 550 villages among the provinces of Alberta, British Columbia, Manitoba, New Brunswick, the Northwest Territories, Ontario, Quebec, Saskatchewan and Yukon. Since then, Kedgwick in New Brunswick changed to rural community status and New Norway in Alberta dissolved to become an unincorporated hamlet, while both Hepburn and Pense in Saskatchewan changed to town status. Saskatchewan has the highest amount of villages at 264.

Alberta 

Alberta had 80 villages as of July 2021.

Notes:

British Columbia 

British Columbia had 42 villages as of January 1, 2012.

Notes:

Manitoba 

Manitoba had 19 villages as of January 1, 2012.

New Brunswick 

New Brunswick had 65 villages as of July 1, 2012.

Newfoundland and Labrador 
Newfoundland and Labrador did not have any incorporated villages as of January 1, 2012.

Northwest Territories 
The Northwest Territories had one village as of January 1, 2012.

Nova Scotia 
In November 2014 Nova Scotia had 22 incorporated villages according to the Union of Nova Scotia Municipalities. The County of Kings had the largest number (7). In a draft fiscal report a recommendation was made to phase out all villages.

Nunavut 
Nunavut  did not have any incorporated villages as of January 1, 2012.

Ontario 

Ontario had 11 villages as of January 1, 2012.

Prince Edward Island 
Prince Edward Island did not have any incorporated villages as of January 1, 2012.

Quebec 

Quebec had 44 villages as of January 1, 2013.

Saskatchewan 

Saskatchewan had 264 villages as of October 24, 2012.

Yukon 
Yukon had four villages as of January 1, 2012.

See also 
List of cities in Canada
List of towns in Canada
Northern village
Resort village
Summer village

References 

Canada